Angela Maria (13 May 1929 – 29 September 2018), the stage name of Abelim Maria da Cunha, was a Brazilian singer and actress. She was elected "Queen of the Radio" in 1954 and was considered the most popular singer of that decade in Brazil.

Discography
1955 –	A Rainha Canta
1956 –	Sucessos de Ontem na Voz de Hoje
1956 –	Angela Maria Apresenta
1957 –	Quando Os Maestros Se Encontram Com Angela Maria
1958 –	Para Você Ouvir e Dançar
1962 –	Incomparável
1962 –	Canta Para o Mundo
1965 –	Boneca
1969 –	Quando a Noite Vem
1969 –	Angela em Tempo Jovem
1970 –	Angela de Todos os Temas
1975 –	Angela
1980 –	Apenas Mulher
1982 –	Estrelas da Canção
1984 –	Sempre Angela
1985 –	Angela Maria
1987 –	Angela Maria
1996 –	Amigos
1997 –	Pela Saudade Que Me Invade: Tributo A Dalva de Oliveira
2006 –	Não Tenho Você

Filmography 
1954 – Rua Sem Sol .... guest actress
1955 – O Rei do Movimento
1956 – Fuzileiro do Amor
1956 – Com Água na Boca
1956 – Fugitivos da Vida
1956 – O Feijão é Nosso
1956 – Tira a mão daí!
1957 – Rio, Zona Norte
1957 – Feitiço do Amazonas
1957 – Metido a Bacana
1957 – O Negócio Foi Assim
1957 – O Samba na Vila
1957 – Rio Fantasia
1959 – Quem Roubou Meu Samba?
1959 – Dorinha no Society
1961 – América de Noite
1961 – Caminho da Esperança
1966 – 007 1/2 no Carnaval
1967 – Carnaval Barra Limpa
1973 – Portugal...Minha Saudade
1975 – A Extorsão

References

1929 births
2018 deaths
20th-century Brazilian women singers
20th-century Brazilian singers
20th-century Brazilian actresses
People from Macaé
Recipients of the Order of Cultural Merit (Brazil)
Women in Latin music